"I'm Still in Love with You" is a song by Jamaican recording artist Sean Paul for his second studio album, Dutty Rock (2002). It features vocals from Sasha. Released on 6 October 2003, the song reached number six in the United Kingdom and number 14 on the US Billboard Hot 100 chart. It also became a top-10 hit in Hungary, Italy, Ireland, and Switzerland.

Composition
The song is an interpolation of "I'm Still in Love with You" by Alton Ellis.

Sean Paul and Sasha (the female counterpart) are discussing a stalled and seemingly unfulfilled relationship. Paul's character is trying to explain that the relationship was somewhat of an extended one-night stand, and that it has no future; Sasha's character seems to want to continue the relationship, despite Paul's admittance of "thug" love because she remains in love with him.

Though the original version's message was more vague, the message in this version seems much clearer in explaining the relationship between the characters in the song's story. Alton Ellis' version was originally produced as a one-man song, but he later teamed up with his sister, Hortense Ellis to perform a duet. It wasn't until this moment that the song showed a romantic battle between two parties to continue a seemingly ruined relationship.

Cover version
Hortense Ellis also did her own version of her brother's song entitled "I'm Still In Love with You (Boy)", which was later done by Marcia Aitken. Aitken's version of the song featured a slight but noticeable difference in vocal pitch from either of the Ellis' versions. Sasha's vocal patterns more closely resemble Marcia's interpretation than that of the Ellis'.

In 2019, Brazilian singer Anitta remade and reenacted the visuals for Sean Paul's original video with her song "Terremoto," featuring Brazilian rapper Kevinho. The video ends with the following messages: "Thank You Sean Paul" and " Remade by João Papa".

Track listings
CD single
 "I'm Still in Love with You" (Album version) – 4:33
 "Like Glue" (Giv Dem A Run Remix) – 4:03

CD maxi
 "I'm Still in Love with You" (Radio Version) – 3:33
 "Steppin' Razor" (Live on Later with Jools Holland) – 3:26
 "Like Glue" (Live on Later with Jools Holland) – 3:07
 "I'm Still in Love with You" (Music Video)

12-inch maxi
 "I'm Still in Love with You" (Album version) – 4:32
 "I'm Still in Love with You" (Instrumental) – 4:32
 "I'm Still in Love with You" (Radio Version) – 3:33
 "Like Glue" (Give Dem A Run Remix) – 4:03

Charts and certifications

Weekly charts

Year-end charts

Certifications

Release history

References

External links
 

2002 songs
2003 singles
Atlantic Records singles
Music videos directed by Director X
Number-one singles in Poland
Reggae songs
Sean Paul songs
Songs written by Sean Paul